The 2017 League of Legends Rift Rivals was the first Rift Rivals - a series of cross-regional League of Legends tournaments organised by Riot Games, held on 3–9 July 2017 in Berlin, Kaohsiung, Santiago, Moscow and Ho Chi Minh City.

Thirteen regions participated in five concurrent tournaments, with each tournament pitting teams from either two or three rival regions against each other.

Blue Rift (EU vs NA) 
The 2017 Rift Rival between North America (NA) - Europe (EU) featured the top three teams from each region's Spring Split. This event took place in Berlin. 
Start date: 5 July 2017
End date: 8 July 2017
Patch: 7.13

Format of the group stage: Each EU team plays each NA team. Best of one, double round robin. The best team from each region plays in the final.

Format of the final: Best of five

Red Rift (CN - KR - LMS) 

The 2017 Rift Rival between China (CN) - South Korea (KR) - Taiwan/Hong Kong/Macau (LMS) featured the top four Spring Split teams from each region. This event took place in Kaohsiung.
Start date: 6 July 2017
End date: 9 July 2017
Patch: 7.12

 
Format of the group stage: Single round robin. Teams with the same seeding play each other to get points for their region. The best region is automatically seeded into the final. The remaining regions play a semifinal to advance to the final.

Format Play-off: Relay best of five. Matchup determined by coaches from both sides. If a fifth game is needed, each region decides which team plays in it.

Yellow Rift (BR - LAN - LAS) 

The 2017 Rift Rival between Brazil (BR) - Latin America North (LAN) - Latin America South (LAS) featured the top two Spring Split teams from each region. This event took place in Santiago.
Start Date: 5 July 2017
End Date: 8 July 2017
Patch: 7.12

Format of the group stage: Single round robin. Each team plays all teams from the other two regions to get points for their region. The best region is automatically seeded into the final. The remaining regions play a semifinal.

Format of the playoff: Relay best of five. Each region's team plays each team from the other region. If a fifth game is needed, each region decides which team plays in it.

Purple Rift (JP - OCE - SEA) 

The 2017 Rift Rival between Southeast Asia (SEA) - Oceania (OCE) - Japan (JP) featured the top three Spring Split teams from each region. This event took place in Ho Chi Minh City.
Start Date: 3 July 2017
End Date: 6 July 2017
Patch: 7.12

Format of the group stage: Single round robin. Teams with the same seeding play each other to get points for their region. Best region is automatically seeded into the final. The remaining regions play a semifinal.

Format of the semifinal: Relay best of five. Last man standing.
Format of the final: Relay best of five. Teams with identical seeds play each other. No team plays more than two games.

Green Rift (CIS - TR) 

The 2017 Rift Rival between Commonwealth of Independent States (CIS) and Turkey (TR) featured the top four Spring/Winter Split teams from each region. This event took place in Moscow.

Start Date: 6 July 2017
End Date: 9 July 2017
Patch: 7.12

Format of the group stage: Each CIS team plays each TR team. Best of one, single round robin. The best team from each region plays in the final.

Format of the final: Best of five

References 

League of Legends competitions
League